John Neely Kennedy (born November 21, 1951) is an American lawyer and politician who has served as the junior United States senator from Louisiana since 2017. A member of the Republican Party who was previously a Democrat, he served as the Louisiana State Treasurer from 2000 to 2017.

Born in Centreville, Mississippi, Kennedy graduated from Vanderbilt University and the University of Virginia School of Law before attending Magdalen College, Oxford. He was a member of Governor Buddy Roemer's staff before unsuccessfully running for state attorney general in the 1991 election. In 1999, he was elected state treasurer; he was reelected to that position in 2003, 2007, 2011, and 2015. Kennedy was an unsuccessful candidate for U.S. Senate in 2004 and 2008. In 2007, he switched parties and became a Republican.

In 2016, when U.S. Senator David Vitter opted not to seek reelection, Kennedy ran for Senate again. He finished first in the November nonpartisan blanket primary and defeated Democrat Foster Campbell 61%–39% in the December runoff. He was sworn in on January 3, 2017. Kennedy was one of six Republican senators to object to the certification of Arizona's electors in the 2020 presidential election.

He was reelected to the U.S. Senate in 2022, defeating twelve opponents with 62% of the vote in the first round.

Early life and education
Kennedy was born in Centreville, Mississippi, and raised in Zachary, Louisiana. After graduating from Zachary High School as co-valedictorian in 1969, he entered Vanderbilt University, where his interdepartmental major was in political science, philosophy and economics. He graduated magna cum laude.

At Vanderbilt, Kennedy was elected president of his senior class and named to Phi Beta Kappa. He received a Juris Doctor in 1977 from the University of Virginia School of Law in Charlottesville, Virginia, where he was an executive editor of the Virginia Law Review and elected to the Order of the Coif. In 1979, he earned a Bachelor of Civil Law degree with first class honours from Magdalen College, Oxford, where he studied under Sir Rupert Cross and John H.C. Morris.

Early career 
Kennedy has written and published the following books and articles: Louisiana State Constitutional Law (LSU Publications Institute, Jan. 1, 2012), The Dimension of Time in the Louisiana Products Liability Act (42 Louisiana Bar Journal, Jan. 1, 1994), The Role of the Consumer Expectation Test Under Louisiana's Products Liability Doctrine (69 Tulane Law Review 117, Jan. 1, 1994), A Primer on the Louisiana Products Liability Act (49 Louisiana Law Review 565, Jan. 1, 1989), Assumption of the Risk, Comparative Fault and Strict Liability After Rozell (47 Louisiana Law Review 791, Jan. 1, 1987) and The Federal Power Commission, Job Bias, and NAACP v. FPC (10 Akron Law Review 556, Jan. 1, 1977).

Kennedy was a partner in the New Orleans law firm Chaffe McCall. He also served as an adjunct professor at Louisiana State University's Paul M. Hebert Law Center in Baton Rouge from 2002 to 2016.

Early political career
In 1988, Kennedy became special counsel to Governor Buddy Roemer. In 1991, he was appointed as cabinet secretary and served in that post until 1992. In 1991, he was an unsuccessful Democratic candidate for state attorney general to succeed the retiring William J. Guste.

Following his first stint in state government, Kennedy returned to private law practice until 1996. That year, he was appointed secretary of the state Department of Revenue in the cabinet of Governor Mike Foster.

Treasurer of Louisiana

Kennedy left the Foster administration when he was elected Louisiana State Treasurer in 1999, having unseated incumbent Democrat Ken Duncan, 621,796 votes (55.6%) to 497,319 (44.4%). Kennedy was reelected treasurer without opposition in 2003, 2007 and 2011. In 2015, he defeated his sole challenger with 80% of the vote.

In the 2004 election, Kennedy endorsed Democratic presidential candidate John Kerry over George W. Bush.

After being courted by the Republican Party for months, Kennedy announced in a letter to his constituents that he was leaving the Democratic Party and joining the Republicans, effective August 27, 2007. In his letter, he announced that he would run again for state treasurer.

During his third term as state treasurer, Kennedy devised a 24-point plan by which the state could save money. Governor Bobby Jindal said Kennedy could "streamline" his own department. Many of Kennedy's ideas were derived from the Louisiana Commission for Streamlining Government, on which he served in his official capacity as state treasurer.

Campaigns for U.S. Senate

2004 

In 2004, Kennedy ran for the U.S. Senate seat held by John Breaux, who was retiring. He ran as a Democrat in the state's jungle primary, losing to Republican David Vitter and Democrat Chris John. Vitter won the election outright.

2008 

Kennedy ran for the Senate again in 2008, this time as a Republican. He was defeated, 52.1% to 45.7%, by incumbent Democratic Senator Mary Landrieu; the same year, Republican presidential nominee John McCain defeated Barack Obama in Louisiana, but Obama was elected.

2016 

On January 26, 2016, Kennedy announced that he would run for Senate a third time. In seeking to succeed the retiring Vitter, he faced more than 20 opponents. Vitter announced his forthcoming retirement from the Senate in 2015 after losing a bid for governor to John Bel Edwards.

Kennedy's senatorial campaign was endorsed by the U.S. Chamber of Commerce, the National Federation of Independent Business, the National Rifle Association, the National Right to Life Committee, the American Conservative Union, Vice President-elect Mike Pence and President-elect Donald Trump. Kennedy, who had supported Vitter for governor the previous year, won the jungle primary and faced Democrat Foster Campbell in a December 10 runoff election. President-elect Donald Trump—who had received Kennedy's support in the 2016 presidential election—campaigned for Kennedy the day before the runoff. Kennedy defeated Campbell by 536,204 votes (61%) to 347,813 (39%). He lost the most-populated parishes of Orleans and East Baton Rouge, in which he had been reared, but was a runaway winner in Campbell's home parish of Bossier.

2022 

Kennedy was reelected in 2022, defeating twelve opponents in an open primary with 62% of the vote in the first round.

U.S. Senate (2017–present)

115th Congress (2017–2019) 

Kennedy was sworn in as Louisiana's junior U.S. Senator on January 3, 2017. He had resigned his position as state treasurer earlier that day.

In June 2017, Kennedy "grilled" Education Secretary Betsy DeVos in a hearing before the Appropriations subcommittee on Labor, Health and Human Service, Education and Related Agencies. In the exchange, he contrasted the lack of school choice available to younger pupils in many rural areas of the country with the numerous brands of mayonnaise available at grocery stores: "Now I can go down to my overpriced Capitol Hill grocery this afternoon and choose among about six different types of mayonnaise. How come I can't do that for my kid?" Kennedy asked. The remark attracted national attention. DeVos replied that the Trump administration budget proposal would give parents and students more power and opportunity so that American education could again become "the envy of the world". Kennedy attracted comment for his manner in the Senate. A January 2018 Huffington Post article reported: "Since being elected to the Senate a year ago, Kennedy ... has made a name for himself on Capitol Hill with his wit, humor and penchant for folksy expressions―a notable feat in a place where jargon and arcane procedure tend to reign supreme".

Kennedy received widespread media attention after he crossed party lines to oppose the appointment of three of Trump's U.S. District Court judicial nominees who Kennedy believed were not qualified: Jeff Mateer, Brett Talley, and Matthew S. Petersen. The White House withdrew all three nominations. On December 13, 2017, during Petersen's confirmation hearing before the Senate Judiciary Committee, Kennedy asked Petersen about basic legal procedure, whether he knew what the Daubert standard was, and what a motion in limine was. Petersen struggled to answer. Kennedy also voted against the nomination of Gregory G. Katsas to the D.C. Circuit, but Katsas was confirmed.

Leading up to the 2019 election, Kennedy was mentioned as a prospective candidate for governor in the jungle primary against Democratic incumbent John Bel Edwards, but on December 3, 2018, he announced that he would not run for governor, saying he preferred to remain in the Senate.

116th Congress (2019–2021) 
In March 2019, Kennedy introduced the Holding Foreign Companies Accountable Act, which was signed into law by President Trump on December 18, 2020. The law prohibits any company from listing on an American stock exchange if it refuses to allow the Public Company Accounting Oversight Board to audit its annual private audit for three consecutive years. It also requires companies to disclose whether they are owned by a foreign government.

After Justice Ruth Bader Ginsburg's death in 2020, Kennedy supported Trump's nomination of Amy Coney Barrett to fill the Supreme Court vacancy. Kennedy voted to confirm Barrett, and in an interview on Tucker Carlson Tonight, he said, "you would have to be barking mad to think that she is not qualified". After her confirmation on October 26, he applauded it as a "victory for our founders".

On March 10, 2021, the Center for Effective Lawmaking ranked Kennedy as one of the ten most effective Republican senators of the 116th Congress, and the most effective Republican senator in the areas of commerce, education, and trade.

117th Congress (2021–2023) 

Following the 2020 presidential election, Kennedy announced that he and 11 other Republican senators would object to certain states' electoral votes in the 2021 United States Electoral College vote count on January 6, 2021, unless the vote was audited. He was participating in the certification when Trump supporters stormed the United States Capitol. He called the attack "despicable and shameful" and called for the rioters "to go to jail and pay for the destruction they caused." When the Capitol was secured and Congress returned to complete the certification, Kennedy objected to the certification of Arizona's electoral votes.

On May 28, 2021, Kennedy voted against the January 6 commission proposed by House Speaker Nancy Pelosi to investigate the January 6 attack. The commission failed to gain traction, but the House later successfully proposed the January 6 committee as an alternative. 

On July 29, 2021, President Joe Biden signed Kennedy's DUMP Opioids Act into law, Kennedy's eighth piece of legislation to become law in his first term as a U.S. senator. Kennedy has authored more bills signed into law than any first-term senator from Louisiana except Newton Blanchard.

On April 7, 2022, Kennedy voted against Ketanji Brown Jackson's nomination to the Supreme Court to succeed Stephen Breyer, who was retiring. At the hearing, he said that he "found Judge Jackson to be smart, well-versed in the law, and extraordinarily deft and artful in her ability to speak at length without saying anything of substance on critical questions—especially the limits of judicial power and the importance of judicial restraint", and added, "I don't agree with the judge on where, based on her opinions, she draws the limits of judicial power, and I don’t think she places as great an importance as I do on judicial restraint in a Madisonian system of checks and balances and separation of powers, and, for that reason, I will be voting no."

118th Congress (2023–present) 
By late 2022 there was again speculation that Kennedy might run for governor in the 2023 election, when Edwards would be term-limited, but he ended the rumors on the second day of the 118th Congress by announcing he again would prefer to stay in the Senate. 

On January 25, 2023, Kennedy quizzed Biden's judicial nominee Charnelle Bjelkengren on basic questions about the Constitution of the United States, whether she could state the functions of Articles V and II, and whether she could define purposivism and the independent state legislature theory. Bjelkengren failed to answer all four questions. After the hearing, Kennedy told a local reporter at NBC news, "Some of these nominees that have been forced in the last two years have no business being anywhere near a federal bench—they don’t have any business being anywhere near a park bench."

Committee assignments
 Committee on Appropriations
 Subcommittee on Agriculture, Rural Development, Food and Drug Administration, and Related Agencies
 Subcommittee on Commerce, Justice, Science, and Related Agencies
 Subcommittee on Energy and Water Development
 Subcommittee on Financial Services and General Government
 Committee on Banking, Housing, and Urban Affairs
 Subcommittee on Economic Policy
 Subcommittee on Financial Institutions and Consumer Protection
 Subcommittee on Housing, Transportation, and Community Development
 Committee on the Budget
 Committee on the Judiciary
 Subcommittee on Border Security and Immigration
 Subcommittee on Crime and Terrorism
 Subcommittee on Privacy, Technology and the Law
 Subcommittee on Intellectual Property
 Committee on Small Business and Entrepreneurship

 Caucuses 
Senate Republican Conference

Political positions

Kennedy holds a score of 89% for the 116th Congress and a lifetime score of 78% from Heritage Action for America. The American Conservative Union's Center of Legislative Accountability gives Kennedy a lifetime rating of 83.74. His Humane Society Legislative Fund rating has ranged between 67% (2019) and 28% (2017), with his last (2020) at 57%. On infrastructure, the National Association of Police Organizations rates Kennedy at 60% and the American Federation of Labor and Congress of Industrial Organizations (AFL-CIO) has assigned him a rating of 8% on matters concerning labor unions.

Animal rights 
Kennedy said he would file a bill to "prohibit airlines from putting animals in overhead bins" after a dog died in an overhead bin while flying United Airlines in March 2018. He said "officials would face significant fines" if noncompliant. In March 2018, Kennedy introduced the Welfare Of Our Furry Friends (WOOFF) Act, but the bill died in committee.

Abortion 
Kennedy is "strongly opposed" to abortion. He supported the 2022 overturning of Roe v. Wade, saying, "today’s decision to return the issue of abortion to the American people and the states corrects a legal and moral error."

Greenhouse emissions 
In 2019, Kennedy introduced the American Innovation and Manufacturing Act, co-sponsored by Senator Tom Carper as an amendment to the American Energy Innovation Act. It would direct the Environmental Protection Agency to phase down production and consumption of hydrofluorocarbons over the next 15 years. Hydrofluorocarbons are potent greenhouse gases used primarily as coolants in refrigerators and air conditioning systems. The American Innovation and Manufacturing Act became law in December 2020 as part of the annual government funding bill.

Guns 
Kennedy has an "A" rating from the National Rifle Association (NRA), which endorsed him during his 2016 Senate run.

Criminal justice 
Kennedy opposed the First Step Act, a bipartisan criminal justice reform bill. The bill passed 87–12 on December 18, 2018.

Net neutrality 
On March 7, 2018, Kennedy introduced a bill that would "prohibit companies like Comcast and Verizon from blocking or throttling web content." He was one of three Republican senators, with Susan Collins and Lisa Murkowski, to vote with the entirety of the Democratic caucus on May 16, 2018, to overturn the FCC's repeal of net neutrality.

Foreign policy 

In April 2018, Kennedy was one of eight Republican senators to sign a letter to United States Secretary of the Treasury Steve Mnuchin and acting Secretary of State John Sullivan expressing "deep concern" over a report by the United Nations exposing "North Korean sanctions evasion involving Russia and China" and asserting that the findings "demonstrate an elaborate and alarming military-venture between rogue, tyrannical states to avoid United States and international sanctions and inflict terror and death upon thousands of innocent people" while calling it "imperative that the United States provides a swift and appropriate response to the continued use of chemical weapons used by Syrian President Bashar al-Assad and his forces, and works to address the shortcomings in sanctions enforcement."

In January 2019, Kennedy was one of 11 Republican senators to vote to advance legislation intended to block Trump's intent to lift sanctions against three Russian companies.

Personal life
Kennedy resides in Madisonville in St. Tammany Parish outside New Orleans with his wife, Becky. He is a founding member of his local Methodist church in Madisonville. Despite sharing the first and last name of the 35th president of the United States, he is not related to the Kennedy family of Massachusetts.

Electoral history

Selected publications 
Kennedy has written and published the following books and articles: 
 "The Federal Power Commission, Job Bias, and NAACP v. FPC." Akron Law Review, vol. 10, no. 556 (January 1, 1977).
 "Assumption of the Risk, Comparative Fault and Strict Liability After Rozell." (47 Louisiana Law Review, vol. 57, no. 791 (January 1, 1987).
 "A Primer on the Louisiana Products Liability Act." Louisiana Law Review, vol. 49, no. 565 (January 1, 1989).
 The Dimension of Time in the Louisiana Products Liability Act (42 Louisiana Bar Journal (January 1, 1994)
 "Role of the Consumer Expectation Test Under Louisiana's Products Liability Tort Doctrine." Tulane Law Review, vol. 69, no. 1 (1994-1995), pp. 117–164.
 Louisiana State Constitutional Law. LSU Publications Institute (January 1, 2012)

See also
 List of American politicians who switched parties in office

References

External links 

 Official U.S. Senate website
 Campaign website
 
 
 
 Campaign contributions at OpenSecrets.org
 Follow the Money – John Kennedy
 2007 2005 2003 1999 Louisiana Treasurer campaign contributions

|-

|-

|-

|-

|-

|-

|-

|-

1951 births
21st-century American politicians
Alumni of Magdalen College, Oxford
American United Methodists
American Methodists
Living people
Louisiana Democrats
Louisiana lawyers
Louisiana Republicans
Louisiana State University faculty
Methodists from Louisiana
People from Centreville, Mississippi
People from St. Tammany Parish, Louisiana
People from Zachary, Louisiana
Politicians from Baton Rouge, Louisiana
Protestants from Louisiana
Republican Party United States senators from Louisiana
State cabinet secretaries of Louisiana
State treasurers of Louisiana
University of Virginia School of Law alumni
Vanderbilt University alumni